Suphajee Suthumpun is a Thai business executive. She is the CEO of the hotel business Dusit International.

Biography
Suthumpun completed a bachelor’s degree in sociology and anthropology at Thammasat University in Bangkok. She also holds a master's degree in business administration, specialising in international finance, from Northrop University in the United States.

Suthumpun worked at IBM for over 20 years, and was the first woman appointed as general manager for the company in Thailand. She was later general manager of IBM ASEAN’s Global Technology Services Division. She has also held the position of CEO of Thaicom. In 2016 she was appointed CEO of Dusit International.

She is also an independent director of Kasikornbank.

References

Living people
Suphajee Suthumpun
Northrop University alumni
Suphajee Suthumpun
Year of birth missing (living people)